Proletář was a publication issued in Brno, Moravia, which began publishing in 1910. Politically it adhered to the line of the Austrian Social Democracy. Proletář issued attacks against the Czechoslav Social Democratic Labour Party and the Czechoslav Trade Union Association. The magazine folded in 1914.

References

Defunct political magazines
Magazines established in 1910
Magazines disestablished in 1914
Socialist magazines
Social Democratic Party of Austria
Defunct magazines published in Czechoslovakia
Mass media in Brno